Pedda Harivanam  is a village panchayath located in the Kurnool district of Andhra Pradesh state, India. The latitude 15.6207125 and longitude 77.0909809 are the geocoordinate of the Pedda Harivanam.

Villages in Kurnool district